The 2020–21 Coupe de France preliminary rounds, Occitanie was the qualifying competition to decide which teams from the leagues of the Occitanie region of France took part in the main competition from the seventh round.

A total of nine teams qualified from the Occitanie preliminary rounds. In 2019–20, AS Fabrègues progressed furthest in the main competition, reaching the ninth round before losing to Paris FC 2–0.

Schedule
A total of 514 teams entered from the region. All teams from Régional 1 and below, 496 in total, entered at the first round stage on 23 August 2020. The second round took place on 30 August 2020. The first two qualifying rounds, drawn on 22 July 2020, took place within individual districts of the league. To allow for a balanced draw, eight teams played outside their own district.

The third round draw, including the teams from Championnat National 3, took place on 9 September 2020. The fourth round draw, including the teams from Championnat National 2, took place on 23 September 2020. The fifth round draw, which saw the entry of the single Championnat National side in the region, took place on 6 October 2020. The sixth round draw was made on 22 October 2020.

First round
These matches are from the Ariège district, and were played on 22 and 23 August 2020.

These matches are from the Aude district, and were played on 22 and 23 August 2020.

These matches are from the Aveyron district, and were played on 21, 22 and 23 August 2020.

These matches are from the Gard-Lozère district, and were played on 21, 22 and 23 August 2020.

These matches are from the Haute-Garonne district, and were played on 22 and 23 August 2020.

These matches are from the Gers district and were played on 22 and 23 August 2020.

These matches are from the Hérault district, and were played on 22 and 23 August 2020.

These matches are from the Lot district, and were played on 21, 22 and 23 August 2020.

These matches are from the Hautes-Pyrénées district, and were played on 21, 22 and 23 August 2020.

These matches are from the Pyrénées-Orientales district, and were played on 22 and 23 August 2020.

These matches are from the Tarn district, and were played on 21, 22 and 23 August 2020.

These matches are from the Tarn-et-Garonne district, and were played on 21, 22 and 23 August 2020.

Second round
These matches are from the Ariège district, and were played on 29 and 30 August 2020.

These matches are from the Aude district, and were played on 30 August 2020.

These matches are from the Aveyron district, and were played on 28, 29 and 30 August 2020, with one postponed until 12 September 2020.

These matches are from the Gard-Lozère district, and were played on 29 and 30 August 2020.

These matches are from the Haute-Garonne district, and were played on 28, 29 and 30 August 2020, with one match postponed.

These matches are from the Gers district and were played on 28, 29 and 30 August 2020.

These matches are from the Hérault district, and were played on 29 and 30 August 2020, with two postponed until 13 September.

These matches are from the Lot district, and were played on 29 and 30 August 2020

These matches are from the Hautes-Pyrénées district, and were played on 28, 29 and 30 August 2020.

These matches are from the Pyrénées-Orientales district, and were played on 30 August 2020.

These matches are from the Tarn district, and were played on 29 and 30 August 2020.

These matches are from the Tarn-et-Garonne district, and were played on 29 and 30 August 2020.

Third round
These matches were played on 18, 19, 20 and 21 September 2020, with one match postponed until 26 September 2020 and two matches to be replayed on 30 September 2020.

Fourth round
These matches were played on 3 and 4 October 2020.

Fifth round
These matches were played on 17 and 18 October 2020.

Sixth round
These matches were played on 31 January 2021.

References

Preliminary rounds